Daniel Glira (born March 25, 1994) is an Italian ice hockey player for HCB South Tyrol and the Italian national team.

He participated at the 2017 IIHF World Championship.

References

External links

1994 births
Living people
Italian ice hockey defencemen
People from Innichen
Bolzano HC players
HC Pustertal Wölfe players
HC Merano players
Sportspeople from Südtirol